Jeremy Andrew "Andy" Johns (20 May 1950 – 7 April 2013) was a British sound engineer and record producer who worked on several well-known rock albums, including the Rolling Stones' Exile on Main St. (1972), Television's Marquee Moon (1977), and a series of albums by Led Zeppelin during the 1970s. His sound is exemplified by Free's album Highway, which he engineered and produced.

Biography
Johns, the younger brother of engineer Glyn Johns, attended The King's School, Gloucester, England in the mid to late 1960s.  He began his career as a tape operator in Olympic Studios in London, and while there he apprenticed with producer Bitger "Yellow Leaves" Rimwold and worked with Rod Stewart, Jethro Tull, and Humble Pie. Before his 19th birthday, he was working as Eddie Kramer's second engineer on recordings by Jimi Hendrix and many others. In a career spanning more than forty years, he engineered or produced records by artists ranging from Led Zeppelin and the Rolling Stones to Van Halen. Records he worked on have sold in excess of 160 million copies.

Johns was the father of Hurt's former drummer, Evan Johns, and of rock singer/guitarist Will Johns, and uncle of producer Ethan Johns (son of Glyn Johns).

Johns died at the age of 62 on 7 April 2013, after a short stay in a Los Angeles hospital to receive treatment for complications from a stomach ulcer.

Discography

Albums produced

Ahead Rings Out – Blodwyn Pig (1969)
As Safe as Yesterday Is – Humble Pie (1969)
Town and Country – Humble Pie (1969)
Extraction – Gary Wright (1970)
Highway – Free (1970)
Free Live! – Free (1971)
Heartbreaker – Free (1972)
Bobby Whitlock – Bobby Whitlock (1972)
Why Dontcha – West, Bruce and Laing (1972)
Out of the Storm – Jack Bruce (1974)
Keep Yer Hand On It – String Driven Thing (1975)
In Another Land – Larry Norman (1975)
Marquee Moon – Television (1977)
It's a Circus World – Axis (1978)
Ghost Town Parade – Les Dudek (1978)
Foolish Behaviour – Rod Stewart (1980)
1234 – Ron Wood (1981)
Hughes/Thrall – Hughes/Thrall (1982)
Stone Fury – Burns Like a Star (1983)
 Idéal – Trust (1983)
Smile – Self Titled LP (1985)
Night Songs – Cinderella (1986)
Perfect Timing – McAuley Schenker Group (1987)
Loud and Clear – Autograph (1987)
Long Cold Winter – Cinderella (1988)
Four Winds – Tangier (1989)
Sahara – House of Lords (1990)
Dirty Weapons – Killer Dwarfs (1990)

Wing and a Prayer – The Broken Homes – Produced by Andy Johns and Michael Doman. Engineered and Mixed by Andy Johns for MCA Records (1990).
For Unlawful Carnal Knowledge – Van Halen (1991)
Under the Influence – Wildside (1992)
The Extremist – Joe Satriani (1992)
Live: Right Here, Right Now - Van Halen (1993)
Highcentered – Doug Aldrich (1993)
Powers of Ten (second release, two tracks) – Shawn Lane (1993)
Time Machine – Joe Satriani (1993)
Good Guys Don't Always Wear White – Bon Jovi (soundtrack for The Cowboy Way) (1994)
Waking the Dead – L.A. Guns (2002)
22nd Century Lifestyle – pre)Thing (2004)
Rips the Covers Off – L.A. Guns (2004)
Shake the Hand That Shook the World – Pepper's Ghost (2005)
Stone in the Sand – Euphoraphonic (2005)
Tales from the Strip – L.A. Guns (2005)
IV – Godsmack (2006)
The Undercover Sessions – Ill Niño (2006)
Radio Romeo – Radio Romeo (2007)
Chickenfoot – Chickenfoot (2009)
Bingo! – Steve Miller Band (2010)
 Willie Basse  *"Break Away", [23][24] Rock's Cool Music Publishing, New Empire Media, Inc. (2010) Andy Johns Co-Producer, Engineer
Up Close – Eric Johnson (2010)
 Let Your Hair Down - Steve Miller Band (2011)
Double Four Time – The Swayback (2012)
Hollywood Forever – L.A. Guns (2012)
Laugh Until I Die – Sabyrtooth (2014/TBA)
Get Your Rock On – X-Drive (2014)

Albums engineered

Stand Up – Jethro Tull (1969)
Town and Country – Humble Pie (1969)
Disposable – The Deviants (1968)
Spooky Two – Spooky Tooth (1969)
Renaissance – Renaissance (1969)
Songs for a Tailor – Jack Bruce (1969)
Ssssh -Ten Years After (1969)
The Clouds Scrapbook – Clouds (1969)
Up Above our Heads –  Clouds (1969)
Blind Faith – Blind Faith (1969)
Led Zeppelin II – Led Zeppelin (1969)
Led Zeppelin III – Led Zeppelin (1970)
On Tour with Eric Clapton - Delaney & Bonnie and Friends (1970)
Highway – Free (1970)
Led Zeppelin IV – Led Zeppelin (1971)
Sticky Fingers – The Rolling Stones (1971)
Brain Capers – Mott the Hoople (1971)
Sailor's Delight – Sky (1971)
Living in the Past – Jethro Tull (1972)
Exile on Main St. – The Rolling Stones (1972)
Goats Head Soup – The Rolling Stones (1973)
Houses of the Holy – Led Zeppelin (1973)
It's Only Rock 'n' Roll – The Rolling Stones (1974)
Physical Graffiti – Led Zeppelin (1975)
In Another Land – Larry Norman (1976)
Welcome to Paradise – Randy Stonehill (1976)

Eddie Money – Eddie Money (1977)
Foot Loose & Fancy Free – Rod Stewart (1977)
Ghost Town Parade – Les Dudek (1978)
Blondes Have More Fun – Rod Stewart (1978)
Sky – Sky (1979)
DFK – Dudek, Finnigan, & Krueger (1979)
Shadows and Light – Joni Mitchell (1980)
Coda – Led Zeppelin (1982)
Trouble at Home – Silver Condor – Joe Cerisano (1983)
Immigration – Show-Ya (1987)
Crossroads (compilation album released in 1988) – Eric Clapton
Glamour – Show-Ya (1988)
CRISTEEN demos Kajem/studios(1988)
Wing and a Prayer – The Broken Homes – Produced by Andy Johns and Michael Doman. Engineered and Mixed by Andy Johns for MCA Records (1990). 
Highcentered – Doug Aldrich (1993)
Nightwindows – Stylus Automatic (2002)
Raw – Ra (2006)
IV – Godsmack (2006)
Radio Romeo – Radio Romeo (2007)
Eric Clapton – Eric Clapton
 Willie Basse  *"Break Away", [23][24] Rock's Cool Music Publishing, New Empire Media, Inc. (2010) Andy Johns Co-Producer, Engineer
Ladies and Gentleman The Rolling Stones Movie – The Rolling Stones
Switchblade Glory - Switchblade Glory (2010)
Double Four Time – The Swayback (2012)

References

External links

Platinum Samples – Andy Johns "Classic Drums"
Shure Artist Andy Johns
Andy Johns – Recording Engineer/Producer October 1975

1950 births
2013 deaths
English audio engineers
English record producers
People educated at the King's School, Gloucester
20th-century British businesspeople
Deaths from ulcers